St Michael's-on-Sea (popularly known as St Michael's or St Mikes) is a small seaside village located on the South Coast of KwaZulu-Natal, South Africa, between Uvongo and Shelly Beach.

Geography 
 
St Micheal's-on-Sea is situated at the mouth of the Mhlanga River, approximately 10 km south-west of Port Shepstone and 5 km north-east of Margate.

St Michael's is bordered by Shelly Beach to the north and Uvongo to the south and falls under the Greater Shelly Beach area sharing the same postal code as Shelly Beach.

Tourism 

St Michael's-on-Sea's named St Michael's Beach or popular known as 'St Mike's Beach' lies on the mouth of the Mhlanga River, lying between its lagoon and the ocean.

St Michael's-on-Sea is synonymous with the St Michaels Sands Hotel and Restaurant, the main landmark of the village which is extremely amongst residents of the South Coast. Other than St Michaels Sands, there are very few holiday apartments surrounding the hotel, a few guest houses and B&Bs.

The C-Bali restaurant, the only restaurant in St Michael's is also popular amongst South Coast residents and lies adjacent the St Michael's Beach.

Transport 

The R620 (Marine Drive) is the thoroughfare through St Michael's-on-Sea, linking the seaside village to Shelly Beach and Port Shepstone in the north-east and Uvongo, Margate, Ramsgate and Southbroom in the south-west.

‘Knoxgore Road’ which begins at the R620 intersection in St Michael's-on-Sea links the village to the township of Gamalakhe in the north-west.

References 

Populated places in the Ray Nkonyeni Local Municipality
Populated coastal places in South Africa
KwaZulu-Natal South Coast